Garluche is a French liqueur and apéritif.

Etymology
Garluche is named after the similarly coloured French endemic variety of sandstone that has long served as a construction material. That name in turn derives from the Gascon garluisha, derived from pre-Latin root kar / gar. Its literal meaning is "the wrong stone."

Alcohol
Garluche is made of white wine, rum and bitter orange peel.

References

French liqueurs
Liqueurs